Omineca River is a river of the North American boreal forest, in northern British Columbia, Canada. It flows into the Williston Lake, and is part of the Peace River basin.  It was originally a tributary of the Finlay River before the creation of Lake Williston. According to Father Adrien-Gabriel Morice the name is derived from a Sekani word meaning 'lake-like or sluggish river'.

Tributaries
Ominicetla Creek
Germansen River
Osilinka River
Mesilinka River

References

Rivers of British Columbia
Omineca Country
Cassiar Land District